Whang-od Oggay (born February 17, 1917), also known as Maria Oggay, is a Filipina tattoo artist from Buscalan, Tinglayan, Kalinga, Philippines. She is often described as the "last" and oldest mambabatok (traditional Kalinga tattooist) and is part of the Butbut people of the larger Kalinga ethnic group.

She has been tattooing headhunters and women of the indigenous people of Butbut in Buscalan, Kalinga, since she was 15 years old, but the Butbut warriors who used to earn tattoos by protecting villages or killing enemies no longer exist. Despite this, Whang-od continues to practice her traditional art form on tourists visiting Buscalan.

The National Commission for Culture and the Arts (NCCA) conferred on Whang-od the prestigious Dangal ng Haraya Award at Tabuk, the capital of Whang-od's ethnic province of Kalinga, in 2018. She was nominated for the National Living Treasures Award (Gawad Manlilikha ng Bayan) in 2017. Her nomination is still being processed by the NCCA.

Biography

Career

Whang-od started tattooing at the age of 15, a traditional artform that she learned from her father who was considered a master tattooist in the region. Traditionally, only men with special tattooing ancestry were allowed to learn the art. Whang-od was an exception due to her talent and potential seen by her father. In later life, Whang-od's chosen apprentices constituted of only women, breaking the patrimonial tradition for the first time in recorded Kalinga history. Despite breaking tradition, her community accepted her decision. She has been doing the batok, the traditional hand-tapped tattooing, on male headhunters who earned the tattoos by protecting villages or killing enemies. She also tattoos women of the Butbut people in Buscalan, Kalinga, primarily for aesthetic purposes. As a traditional Kalinga tattooist or mambabatok, she has done fortune telling and chants while doing tattoos. Every design she creates contains symbolic meanings specific to the mambabatok culture. For example, a warrior who had killed an enemy would be given an eagle tattoo upon his return from battle.

She was first tattooed as a teenager with the designs consisting of a ladder and a python.  The python tattoo was especially important in her people's sacred stories. According to their indigenous religion, the python scale tattoo was first given to Lagkunawa, a beautiful noblewoman from the village of Tinglayan (Whang-od's home village). It was a gift from the hero-god Banna, who fell in love with the mortal. Ever since, the tattoo was passed on through the generations. Fatok is the term used for tattooing women to show beauty and wealth. When a woman's arm is tattooed just like Whang-od's own tattoos, the family of the woman is obliged to pay the tattoo artist a piglet or a bundle of harvested rice (locally called as dalan). On the other hand, fi-ing is the term used for tattooing of male Butbut warriors on their chests and arms. Whang-od used to practice fi-ing until headhunting was discouraged by the government. Fi-ing was last practiced in 1972.

Though headhunters no longer exist, Whang-od still applies the tattoos on Buscalan tourists. She however no longer chants when tattooing tourists, as the chants are only for the beautification of Kalinga women and for the celebration of Kalinga men's victory in battle. Some of her notable customers include Rhian Ramos, Drew Arellano, Liza Diño and Ice Seguerra.

Her early tattoo works did not earn her any income but due to the influx of tourists in her town, she was earning at least Php 5,000 a day for her tattooing in 2015. She accepts around twenty to thirty customers every day. She only does simple tattoos nowadays due to her advanced age. Her apprentices, all women, have continued the tradition for her and their people.

The tattoo ink she uses is composed of indigenous materials, usually a mixture of charcoal and water that is tapped into the skin using a thorn from a calamansi or pomelo tree. This ancient technique of batok dates back a thousand years and is relatively painful compared to conventional techniques. She uses designs found in nature and basic geometric shapes. She has numerous signature tattoos, but since 2017, her signature tattoo is composed of three dots, representing herself and her two apprentices, depicted as a continuation of the art form from the older to the next generation.

Aside from being a tattoo artist, Whang-od is a respected village elder and plays the nose flute. She also does agricultural tasks, such as feeding pigs and chickens; and cultivating rice.

Personal life
When she was very young, Whang-od had a boyfriend named Ang-Batang, a Butbut warrior. She performed a batok on Ang-Batang after the warrior's first victory in a battle. Many elders opposed her relations with Ang-Batang, believing the man's bloodline was not pure. A marriage was eventually arranged for Ang-Batang and Whang-od's best friend Hogkajon. Ang-Batang died as the result of a logging accident when Whang-od was 25 years old.

She later decided never to marry, and thus has no children and leaves no direct descendants to continue her legacy as a mambabatok or traditional Kalinga tattoo artist. She had relationships with other Kalinga warriors, but remained unmarried due to her vow. According to tradition, her tattooing skills can only be inherited through lineage. Whang-od believes that if someone outside the bloodline starts tattooing, the tattoos will become infected. The influence of modernity meant that the young people of her village were no longer interested in embracing the tattooing works of their elders for decades, until a rise in appreciation of Indigenous ways in the 21st century paved the way for the conservation of the art form in Buscalan. Whang-od has trained Grace Palicas, her grandniece, and Ilyang Wigan, another bloodline successor, to continue her people's tattoo artistry. More bloodline successors have gradually become interested in their people's artforms, including a 12-year-old named Den Wigan. However, these successors have not performed the other works of a mambabatok, and their own tattoos are not as intricate as those of Whang-od. Furthermore, according to Filipino anthropologist Analyn Salvador-Amores, the other batok traditions, which include chanting and fortune-telling, and the revelation of the symbolic meanings of the tattoos, may fade away with Whang-od because these are not transferred to her successors. Chanting and fortune-telling are only performed for the Kalinga people, never for people outside the ethnic sphere. With that, Whang-od may be the last mambabatok of her village, unless (1) the indigenous Kalinga peoples themselves formally choose to get traditional tattoos as part of their modern culture, and (2) her apprentices master the elaborate and highly difficult tattoo chanting arts before she passes away.

Legacy and cultural impact 
Senator Nancy Binay stated that Whang-od's impact on Filipino culture has helped raise awareness and keep the knowledge, tradition and culture of Kalinga tattoos alive and known for the younger generations and people outside of Filipino culture. The practice of Kalinga tattoos was almost extinct and the idea was obscure, "The tradition of Batok has changed with the modern times in the last millennia." Whang-od's title as the "Last Kalinga Tattoo Artist"  will soon be inaccurate. It is said Whang-od is now teaching 20 young girls, plus her grandnieces the art of mambabatok so that the tradition and knowledge will not die with her and so that her legacy will be carried through her students and grandnieces. Out of her twenty young students that she teaches, only Grace Palicas and Ilyang Wigan are considered her only real apprentices; due to tradition, the apprenticeship of batok must only be passed down and taught to blood relatives. Whang-od's "signature" tattoo consists of three dots, representing herself and her blood-related apprentices and representing a next generation in her art. These Kalinga tattoos, despite consisting of symbols occurring in nature carrying simple geometric patterns, do not carry the same meaning they had when they were earned through warfaring culture.

Centenary 
According to various sources, Whang-od was born on February 17, 1917, and she turned 100 in 2017 making her eligible to receive benefits from the Philippine government as per Centenarians Act of 2016 or Republic Act 10868. However, the government and some groups doubted her claim as she has not presented any valid documents to prove her birth date. There were no birth date recordings in many hinterland areas in the Philippines, such as Buscalan, during the time Whang-od was said to be born, namely because of: the impossibility of traversing the area at the time, recordings of birth dates on paper was not a part of the community's culture at the time, and past ethnic tensions that fueled tribal wars. In June 2017, she received a Philippine postal ID that formally recognized her date of birth as February 17, 1917, making her eligible for benefits under the Centenarians Act.

Recognition 
Due to Whang-od's status as the last mambabatok of her generation, her role in bringing awareness to a form of traditional tattooing and training several practitioners, many netizens were lobbying her to be one of the National Artists of the Philippines. A hashtag campaign (#WangOdNationalArtist) started in September 2015 and the hashtag was shared through social media about 11 thousand times after almost a month. Some netizens were campaigning for her to be given the National Living Treasures Award instead.

In 2015, then Senator Miriam Defensor Santiago urged her colleagues in the Philippine Senate through a resolution that Whang-od should be nominated as one of the National Living Treasures (GAMABA or Gawad Manlilikha ng Bayan in Tagalog), who are of equal rank to National Artists. Senator Nancy Binay through a senate resolution in June 2016 enjoined the Philippine senate to nominate Whang-od as a National Living Treasure. Likewise, her nomination as National Artist or National Living Treasure has been backed by Senator and United Nations ambassador Loren Legarda through a separate Senate resolution.

Former National Commission for Culture and the Arts of the Philippines (NCCA) chair Felipe de Leon Jr. also expressed his support for Whang-od's nomination and argued that the role of a mambabatok is to become the beacon of togetherness and support of the community. He also added that she aids her community through tattooing tourists and she is practicing traditional Kalinga art form as means of living and therefore should be eligible for both the National Living Treasure Award and the National Artists Award. Filipino anthropologist and University of the Philippines Baguio professor Analyn Salvado-Amores said that though she has no objections on Whang-od's nomination to the GAMABA, Whang-od might not get conferred because she earns from tattooing and one of the requirement for a GAMABA award is to practice the craft without making any profit from it. However, if the raised issue would hinder her declaration as National Living Treasure, then she may still be nominated for the National Artist Award, which is same in rank to the National Living Treasure Award.

Whang-od was formally nominated to the National Living Treasures Award during the 66th Manila Fame event on October 21, 2017. The nomination was accepted by the NCCA through a ceremony within the event. NCCA is finalizing the documents to confer Whang-od and have the Philippine President to sign it. Once conferred, Whang-od would get a gold medallion, a monthly allowance of Php 14,000 and a starting grant of Php 100,000. On February 28, 2018, the Senate of the Philippines unanimously passed a resolution supporting and nominating Whang-od for the GAMABA.

On June 12, 2018, the National Commission for Culture and the Arts announced that the prestigious Dangal ng Haraya Award will be given to Whang-od on June 25 at Tabuk, Kalinga, the capital of Whang-od's home province. The final stages of the GAMABA (National Living Treasures Award) Committee is still ongoing.

Events
Whang-od was present during Dutdutan Tattoo Expo 2012 held in the Philippines where she had her own booth. Whang-od's image is included in an exhibit at the Royal Ontario Museum in Canada. The exhibit is entitled Tattoos: Ritual. Identity. Obsession. Art and it was first shown on April 2, 2016. Exhibitors chose the photograph from several photos from another exhibit at Musee Du Quai Branly in Paris. They did not know about Whang-od until a visitor told them.

In October 2017, Whang-od together with Palicas and Wigan, her apprentices and grandnieces, went to Metro Manila to show their craftsmanship at the 66th Manila Fame trade show. Organizers of the Manila Fame was criticized after a photo that went viral in social media surfaced. Some netizens accused the organizers of exploiting Whang-od and commodifying her culture. The organizers defended the event, and Whang-od's niece, Palicas, later clarified the issue. In August 2021, Palicas called out a foreigner, Nas Daily, for creating a Whang-od Academy without actual consent from her tribe. Under Philippine law, free and prior informed consent (FPIC) is a requirement with "consensus of all members of the ICCs/IPs".

Television features
American anthropologist Lars Krutak visited Kalinga in 2007 and documented Whang-od's tattoo works. The episode of Krutak's 10-part series Tattoo Hunter featured on Discovery Channel became the start of presenting the Kalinga culture and Whang-od to a global audience. In 2010, she was also featured in i-Witness, a documentary television program of GMA Network, that was documented by Kara David.

In 2017, Whang-od was featured in the Dayaw series of the NCCA and ABS-CBN News Channel, where her contributions to the country's national identity and heritage were presented by former NCCA Chairman Felipe De Leon Jr. and Senator Loren Legarda. Her life story was featured in Wagas, a GMA News TV's drama series in 2017, where Janine Gutierrez portrayed Whang-od.

See also
 Philippine tattoos
 Visayan tattoos
 Kalinga (province)
 Macli-ing Dulag
 Whang-Od: The thorns lady of the Philippines

References 

1917 births
Living people
Filipino artists
Filipino centenarians
Filipino tattoo artists
Indigenous artists
Indigenous peoples of the Philippines
People from the Cordillera Administrative Region
People from Kalinga (province)
Tattoo artists
Women centenarians
Filipino women